Nikolett Diószegi (born 31 March 1996) is a Hungarian handballer who plays for Váci NKSE.

References

1996 births
Living people
People from Békéscsaba
Hungarian female handball players
Sportspeople from Békés County